Pallacanestro Cantù history and statistics in FIBA Europe and Euroleague Basketball competitions.

European competitions

Worldwide competitions

External links
FIBA Europe
Euroleague
ULEB
Eurocup

Basketball teams in Lombardy
EuroLeague-winning clubs